Diamond Lake is a natural lake in South Dakota, in the United States.

Diamond Lake was named on account of its outline resembling a diamond.

See also
List of lakes in South Dakota

References

Lakes of South Dakota
Lakes of Minnehaha County, South Dakota